Roundalab is an American educational non-profit organization established in 1976 for round dance cuers and teachers.

Background
The organization publishes a manual that standardizes round dance figures in over a dozen Smooth and Latin rhythms.  It sponsors an annual convention, organizes a variety of educational seminars and laboratories, and offers teaching manuals, educational videos, and guidelines for all aspects of the activity.

External links
Roundalab website

Dance organizations
Dance education in the United States